Ian Workman (born 13 November 1962, Liverpool) is an English former footballer who played in The Football League for Chester.

Workman's only taste of professional football came with Chester during 1982–83, between two spells with non-league Southport. He made three league appearances against Crewe Alexandra, Port Vale and Halifax Town and also featured in two Football League Trophy ties.

Having been playing on a non-contract basis, Workman was then released and joined the police force.

Bibliography

References

1962 births
Living people
Footballers from Liverpool
English Football League players
Association football midfielders
English footballers
Southport F.C. players
Chester City F.C. players